Bernard Mouat Jones DSO (27 November 188211 September 1953) was a British Chemist, notable for identifying the chemical in Mustard gas (dicholorodiethyl sulphide) and the first scientist to be vice-chancellor of the University of Leeds.

Background
Jones was born in Streatham on 27 November 1882, the fourth son of Alexander Moat Jones, wine merchant, and Martha Eleanor (née Brinjes). He attended Queen's College, Streatham and Dulwich College. In 1901 he went to Balliol College, Oxford where, three years later, he gained first-class honours in chemistry, mineralogy, and crystallography.

Career
Jones worked for a year as research assistant to Professor W R Dunstan at the Imperial Institute, and was then, in 1906, appointed professor of chemistry at Government College, Lahore. In 1913 he returned to England as assistant professor at the Imperial College of Science and Technology.

In 1914 Jones enlisted in the London Scottish regiment and was sent to France. Immediately after the first German gas attack in 1915 he was promoted to captain and became assistant director of the central laboratory, general headquarters, formed to organize defensive measures. He devised methods of protection from phosgene gas, and in identifying quickly any new gas used by the enemy; he was the first to identify the chemical in mustard gas. For his services he was appointed the DSO in 1917 and, in the following year, became director of the laboratory with the rank of lieutenant-colonel.

After the war he returned to academic life, as a chemistry professor at the University College of Wales, Aberystwyth, then in 1921 Principal of Manchester Municipal College of Technology. From 1938 to 1948 he was vice-chancellor of the University of Leeds. This included the Second World War, in which he also served in the Home Guard and for six months was in charge of the chemical warfare establishment at Porton Down.

Jones, who never married, lived after his retirement at Waverley Abbey House, Farnham, where he died on 11 September 1953. His funeral was held at Farnham parish church on 17 September.

References

1882 births
1953 deaths
British Home Guard officers
Military personnel from London
London Scottish officers
London Scottish soldiers
British chemists
People from Streatham
Alumni of Balliol College, Oxford
Academics of Imperial College London
Academics of Aberystwyth University
Academics of the University of Manchester Institute of Science and Technology
Vice-Chancellors of the University of Leeds
Companions of the Distinguished Service Order
British Army personnel of World War I
British Army General List officers
Academic staff of the Government College University, Lahore
Manchester Literary and Philosophical Society